The Cathedral Rocks are a series of four abrupt cliffs interspersed by short glaciers and surmounted by sharp peaks. The cliffs extend for  along the south side of Ferrar Glacier and form part of the north shoulder of the Royal Society Range, in Victoria Land. They were discovered and named on December 7, 1902 by Lieutenant A.B. Armitage, leader of a party of the British National Antarctic Expedition, 1901–04, that explored this area. The name is descriptive of the feature.

References 

Cliffs of Victoria Land
Scott Coast